Betsy Brannon Green (born June 1, 1958) is a Latter Day Saint mystery/suspense novelist. She is a member of the Church of Jesus Christ of Latter-day Saints.

Biography
Green was born in Salt Lake City, Utah, and grew up moving all over the country, since her father was in the US Army. In 1979, she married Robert Green, and they currently live in Bessemer, Alabama. They are the parents of eight children. Green's fiction is inspired by the people of Headland, Alabama. Green started writing in 1999 and Covenant Communications published her debut, Hearts in Hiding, in 2001.

Criticism
In 2012, the audiobook version of Murder by the Way was in Deseret Book's top five bestsellers for June 25–30. Reviewing the book in Deseret News, Alicia Cunningham wrote that while the mystery was predictable it was entertaining. Writing on LDS Fiction, Penny Bowler called books like Green's the "comfort food" of literature. Murder by Design was a top-10 bestseller from Deseret Book for the October 17 to October 23 sales interval. In a review for LDS Magazine, Jennie Hansen wrote that Proceed With Caution was "difficult [...] to put down" with realistic dialogue. Mike Whitmer praised the sequel, Danger Ahead (2015) for its lack of sexual content and graphic violence. Sharon Haddock wrote that Puzzle Pieces (2016) was convoluted, with an implausible ending and "simple outcomes."

Awards
Green's books have been finalists four times for the Whitney award for best mystery/suspense novel; in 2010 for Murder By Design, in 2009 for Murder by the Book, in 2008 for Above and Beyond and in 2007 for Hazardous Duty In 2008, Green was voted the 8th-most-popular writer by readers of the Deseret News.

Works
The following books are published by Covenant Communications in American Fork, Utah.

Order of Haggerty series

Order of Eureka series

Order of Duty series

Kennedy Killingsworth mysteries

Proceed with Caution series

References

External links
 Official Website of Betsy Brannon Green
 Betsy Brannon Green, MSS 8072 at L. Tom Perry Special Collections, Brigham Young University

1958 births
20th-century American non-fiction writers
20th-century American novelists
20th-century American women writers
21st-century American non-fiction writers
21st-century American novelists
21st-century American women writers
American Latter Day Saint writers
American mystery novelists
American women non-fiction writers
American women novelists
Latter Day Saints from Alabama
Latter Day Saints from Utah
Living people
Women mystery writers
Harold B. Lee Library-related 21st century articles